Tunnel Through Time is a 1966 science fiction novel written by Paul W. Fairman under American science fiction and fantasy author Lester del Rey's byline. It is a children's time travel adventure.

Plot summary
The novel tells the story of a teen named Bob Miller whose scientist father, Sam Miller,  has invented a "time ring", a circular device that allows time travel. Bob and his friend Pete travel through time in search of Pete's father ("Doc Tom", a paleontologist) who has disappeared while traveling alone. Beginning in the Mesozoic Era, Tom's planned destination, the story depicts various adventures while the travelers jump from point to point in Earth's prehistory; although they are able to locate the missing Dr. Tom Miller almost immediately upon arriving in the Mesozoic era, the time machine is unexpectedly damaged when a dinosaur runs into it. As a result, the three are unable to immediately travel directly forward through time to their present, and instead are forced to "hop" through different eras of prehistory until they finally arrive home.

Literary significance and reception
This book was used in many elementary and middle school classrooms for reading and literature classes, and gained a notable popularity with its straightforward, dramatic writing style.

Publishing history
The book was originally published in hardcover by Westminster Press in May 1966 and in paperback by Scholastic Corporation. It was reprinted several times, most recently in 1974.

See also
 
 A Wrinkle in Time

References

1966 American novels
1966 science fiction novels
American science fiction novels
Children's novels about dinosaurs
Children's science fiction novels
Novels about time travel
Novels by Lester del Rey
Works published under a pseudonym